Leszek Bebło (born 8 July 1966 in Sokolniki near Tarnobrzeg) is a former long-distance runner from Poland, who represented his native country at two consecutive Summer Olympics, starting in 1992 in Barcelona, Spain. He set his personal best (2:09:42) in the classic distance in 1995.

Achievements

References
 

1966 births
Living people
Polish male long-distance runners
Athletes (track and field) at the 1992 Summer Olympics
Athletes (track and field) at the 1996 Summer Olympics
Olympic athletes of Poland
Paris Marathon male winners
People from Tarnobrzeg
Sportspeople from Podkarpackie Voivodeship